Najee Toran (born November 15, 1995) is an American football guard who is a free agent. He played college football at UCLA and signed as an undrafted free agent with the San Francisco 49ers in 2018.

Professional career

San Francisco 49ers
Toran was signed by the San Francisco 49ers as an undrafted free agent on May 1, 2018. He was waived on September 1, 2018, and was signed to the practice squad the next day. He was promoted to the active roster on September 12, 2018. He was waived on October 6, 2018, and was re-signed to the practice squad. He signed a reserve/future contract with the 49ers on January 2, 2019. On August 31, 2019, the 49ers cut Toran.

New England Patriots
On September 2, 2019, Toran was signed to the New England Patriots' practice squad. He signed a reserve/future contract with the Patriots on January 6, 2020. On July 29, 2020, Toran exercised his option to opt out of the 2020 season due to the COVID-19 pandemic. He was waived after the season on May 18, 2021.

Washington Football Team
Toran signed with the Washington Football Team on June 7, 2021, but was released after failing to report to training camp.

References

External links
UCLA Bruins bio

1995 births
Living people
American football offensive guards
New England Patriots players
Players of American football from Houston
San Francisco 49ers players
UCLA Bruins football players
Washington Football Team players